The following outline is provided as an overview of and topical guide to Luxembourg:

Luxembourg – small sovereign country located in Western Europe, bordered by Belgium, France, and Germany.  Luxembourg has a population of half a million people in an area of approximately 2,586 square kilometres (999 sq mi).

Luxembourg is a parliamentary representative democracy with a constitutional monarchy, ruled by a Grand Duke. It is the world's only remaining sovereign Grand Duchy. The country has a highly developed economy, with the highest Gross Domestic Product per capita in the world (U.S. Central Intelligence Agency 2007). Its historic and strategic importance dates back to its founding as a Roman era fortress site and Frankish count's castle site in the Early Middle Ages. It was an important bastion along the Spanish road when Spain was the principal European power influencing the whole western hemisphere and beyond in the 14th–17th centuries.

Luxembourg is a founding member of the European Union, NATO, the United Nations, Benelux, and the Western European Union, reflecting the political consensus in favour of economic, political, and military integration.  The city of Luxembourg, the capital and largest city, is the seat of several institutions and agencies of the European Union.

Luxembourg lies on the cultural divide between Romance Europe and Germanic Europe, borrowing customs from each of the distinct traditions. Luxembourg is a trilingual country; French, German, and Luxembourgish are official languages. Although a secular state, Luxembourg is predominantly Roman Catholic.

General reference 

 Pronunciation:
 Common English country name:  Luxembourg
 Official English country name:  The Grand Duchy of Luxembourg
 Common endonym(s):  
 Official endonym(s):  
 Adjectival(s): Luxembourg
 Demonym(s): Luxembourger
 Etymology: Lucilinburhuc, little castle
 International rankings of Luxembourg
 ISO country codes:  LU, LUX, 442
 ISO region codes:  See ISO 3166-2:LU
 Internet country code top-level domain:  .lu

Geography of Luxembourg 

Geography of Luxembourg
 Luxembourg is: a landlocked country
 Location:
 Northern Hemisphere and Eastern Hemisphere
 Eurasia
 Europe
 Western Europe
 Time zone:  Central European Time (UTC+01), Central European Summer Time (UTC+02)
 Extreme points of Luxembourg
 High:  Kneiff 
 Low:  Moselle River 
 Land boundaries:  359 km
 148 km
 138 km
 73 km
 Coastline:  none
 Population of Luxembourg: 634,730 (2021 estimate)  - 163rd most populous country

 Area of Luxembourg: 2,586 km2
 Atlas of Luxembourg

Environment of Luxembourg 

Environment of Luxembourg
 Climate of Luxembourg
 Renewable energy in Luxembourg
 Geology of Luxembourg
 Global warming in Luxembourg
 Protected areas of Luxembourg
 Biosphere reserves in Luxembourg
 National parks of Luxembourg
 Wildlife of Luxembourg
 Fauna of Luxembourg
 Birds of Luxembourg
 Mammals of Luxembourg

Natural geographic features of Luxembourg 
 Rivers of Luxembourg
 Sandstone formation in Luxembourg
 World Heritage Sites in Luxembourg

Regions of Luxembourg 
 Regions of Luxembourg: Gutland; Oesling

Ecoregions of Luxembourg 

List of ecoregions in Luxembourg
 Ecoregions in Luxembourg

Administrative divisions of Luxembourg 

Administrative divisions of Luxembourg
 Districts of Luxembourg
 Cantons of Luxembourg
 Communes of Luxembourg

Districts of Luxembourg 

Districts of Luxembourg

Cantons of Luxembourg 

Cantons of Luxembourg

Communes of Luxembourg 

Communes of Luxembourg

Municipalities of Luxembourg 

 Capital of Luxembourg: Luxembourg City
 Cities of Luxembourg

Villages of Luxembourg 
 List of villages in Luxembourg

Demography of Luxembourg 

Demographics of Luxembourg

Government and politics of Luxembourg 

Politics of Luxembourg
 Form of government: Constitutional monarchy
 Capital of Luxembourg: Luxembourg City
 Elections in Luxembourg
 Political parties in Luxembourg

Branches of the government of Luxembourg 

Government of Luxembourg

Executive branch of the government of Luxembourg 
 Head of state: Grand Duke of Luxembourg,
 Head of government: Prime Minister of Luxembourg,
 Cabinet of Luxembourg

Legislative branch of the government of Luxembourg 

 Chamber of Deputies of Luxembourg (unicameral)

Judicial branch of the government of Luxembourg 

Court system of Luxembourg
 Supreme Court of Luxembourg

Foreign relations of Luxembourg 

Foreign relations of Luxembourg
 Diplomatic missions in Luxembourg
 Diplomatic missions of Luxembourg

International organization membership 
The Grand Duchy of Luxembourg is a member of:

Asian Development Bank (ADB) (nonregional member)
Australia Group
Benelux Economic Union (Benelux)
Council of Europe (CE)
Economic and Monetary Union (EMU)
Euro-Atlantic Partnership Council (EAPC)
European Bank for Reconstruction and Development (EBRD)
European Investment Bank (EIB)
European Space Agency (ESA)
European Union (EU)
Food and Agriculture Organization (FAO)
International Atomic Energy Agency (IAEA)
International Bank for Reconstruction and Development (IBRD)
International Chamber of Commerce (ICC)
International Civil Aviation Organization (ICAO)
International Criminal Court (ICCt)
International Criminal Police Organization (Interpol)
International Development Association (IDA)
International Energy Agency (IEA)
International Federation of Red Cross and Red Crescent Societies (IFRCS)
International Finance Corporation (IFC)
International Fund for Agricultural Development (IFAD)
International Labour Organization (ILO)
International Maritime Organization (IMO)
International Monetary Fund (IMF)
International Olympic Committee (IOC)
International Organization for Migration (IOM)
International Organization for Standardization (ISO)
International Red Cross and Red Crescent Movement (ICRM)
International Telecommunication Union (ITU)
International Telecommunications Satellite Organization (ITSO)

International Trade Union Confederation (ITUC)
Inter-Parliamentary Union (IPU)
Multilateral Investment Guarantee Agency (MIGA)
North Atlantic Treaty Organization (NATO)
Nuclear Energy Agency (NEA)
Nuclear Suppliers Group (NSG)
Organisation internationale de la Francophonie (OIF)
Organisation for Economic Co-operation and Development (OECD)
Organization for Security and Cooperation in Europe (OSCE)
Organisation for the Prohibition of Chemical Weapons (OPCW)
Organization of American States (OAS) (observer)
Permanent Court of Arbitration (PCA)
Schengen Convention
United Nations (UN)
United Nations Conference on Trade and Development (UNCTAD)
United Nations Educational, Scientific, and Cultural Organization (UNESCO)
United Nations High Commissioner for Refugees (UNHCR)
United Nations Industrial Development Organization (UNIDO)
United Nations Interim Force in Lebanon (UNIFIL)
United Nations Relief and Works Agency for Palestine Refugees in the Near East (UNRWA)
Universal Postal Union (UPU)
Western European Union (WEU)
World Confederation of Labour (WCL)
World Customs Organization (WCO)
World Federation of Trade Unions (WFTU)
World Health Organization (WHO)
World Intellectual Property Organization (WIPO)
World Meteorological Organization (WMO)
World Trade Organization (WTO)
World Veterans Federation
Zangger Committee (ZC)

Law and order in Luxembourg 

Law of Luxembourg
 Constitution of Luxembourg
 Crime in Luxembourg
 Human rights in Luxembourg
 LGBT rights in Luxembourg
 Freedom of religion in Luxembourg
 Law enforcement in Luxembourg

Military of Luxembourg 

Military of Luxembourg
 Command
 Commander-in-chief: Grand Duke Henri
 Minister for Defence: Jean-Marie Halsdorf
 Ministry of Defence of Luxembourg
 Chief of Defence: Gaston Reinig
 Forces
 Army of Luxembourg
 Navy of Luxembourg: None
 Air Force of Luxembourg
 Special forces of Luxembourg
 Military history of Luxembourg
 Military ranks of Luxembourg

Local government in Luxembourg 

Local government in Luxembourg

History of Luxembourg 

History of Luxembourg
Timeline of the history of Luxembourg
Current events of Luxembourg
 Celtic Luxembourg
 County of Luxembourg
 Duchy of Luxembourg
 Habsburg Netherlands
Forêts
German occupation of Luxembourg during World War I
Luxembourg in World War II
 Military history of Luxembourg

Culture of Luxembourg 

Culture of Luxembourg
 Architecture of Luxembourg
 Tallest structures in Luxembourg
 Cuisine of Luxembourg
 Festivals in Luxembourg
 Languages of Luxembourg
 Multilingualism in Luxembourg
 Luxembourgish
 Luxembourg American Cultural Society
 Media in Luxembourg
 Newspapers in Luxembourg
 Radio stations in Luxembourg
 Television in Luxembourg
 Museums in Luxembourg
 National symbols of Luxembourg
 Coat of arms of Luxembourg
 Flag of Luxembourg
 National anthem of Luxembourg
 People of Luxembourg
 Social class in Luxembourg
 Prostitution in Luxembourg
 Public holidays in Luxembourg
 Records of Luxembourg
 Religion in Luxembourg
 Christianity in Luxembourg
 Roman Catholicism in Luxembourg
 Protestantism in Luxembourg
 Hinduism in Luxembourg
 Islam in Luxembourg
 Judaism in Luxembourg
 Sikhism in Luxembourg
 World Heritage Sites in Luxembourg

Art in Luxembourg 

Art of Luxembourg
 Notable artists
 Painters from Luxembourg
 Architecture of Luxembourg
 Photography in Luxembourg
 Photothèque (Luxembourg)
 Cinema of Luxembourg
 Literature of Luxembourg
 Servais Prize
 Music of Luxembourg
 Theatre in Luxembourg
 Théâtre des Capucins

Sports in Luxembourg 

Sports in Luxembourg
 Football in Luxembourg
 Luxembourg at the Olympics
 Luxembourg national baseball team

Economy and infrastructure of Luxembourg 

Economy of Luxembourg
 Economic rank, by nominal GDP (2007): 65th (sixty-fifth)
 Accountancy in Luxembourg
 Agriculture in Luxembourg
 Banking in Luxembourg
 National Bank of Luxembourg
 Luxembourg for Finance
 Communications in Luxembourg
 Internet in Luxembourg
 Companies of Luxembourg

Currency of Luxembourg: Euro (see also: Euro topics)
 Previous currency: Luxembourgish franc
ISO 4217: EUR
 Electricity sector in Luxembourg
 Energy in Luxembourg
 Energy policy of Luxembourg
 Oil industry in Luxembourg
 Nuclear energy in Luxembourg
 Health care in Luxembourg
 Mining in Luxembourg
 Social welfare in Luxembourg
 Steel industry in Luxembourg
 Luxembourg Stock Exchange
 Tourism in Luxembourg
 Valley of the Seven Castles
 Visa policy of Luxembourg
 Transport in Luxembourg
 Airports in Luxembourg
 Rail transport in Luxembourg
 Roads in Luxembourg
 Trams in Luxembourg

Education in Luxembourg 

Education in Luxembourg

Lists 
 List of airports in Luxembourg
 List of archbishops of Luxembourg
 List of artists from Luxembourg
 List of banks in Luxembourg
 List of castles in Luxembourg
 List of communes of Luxembourg
 List of companies of Luxembourg
 List of consorts of Luxembourg
 List of diplomatic missions of Luxembourg
 list of film actors of Luxembourg
 List of flags of Luxembourg
 List of Governors of Luxembourg
 List of heirs to the throne of Luxembourg
 List of honours of Luxembourg awarded to heads of state and royalty
 List of Lepidoptera of Luxembourg
 List of mayors of Luxembourg City
 List of Ministers for Finances of Luxembourg
 List of motorways in Luxembourg
 List of museums in Luxembourg
 List of newspapers in Luxembourg
 List of political parties in Luxembourg
 List of railway stations in Luxembourg
 List of rivers of Luxembourg
 List of towns in Luxembourg
 List of villages in Luxembourg
 List of wars involving Luxembourg
 List of World Heritage Sites in Luxembourg

See also 

Luxembourg
List of international rankings
Member state of the European Union
Member state of the North Atlantic Treaty Organization
Member state of the United Nations
Outline of Europe
Outline of geography
Ranked list of Luxembourg cantons

References

External links 

 Governments on the WWW: Luxembourg
 History of Luxembourg: Primary Documents
 Official Governmental Site
 Official Website for Luxembourg
 Luxembourg National Tourist Office
 Luxembourg Tourist Office - London
 Luxembourg City Tourist Guide
 Luxembourg Geography
 Luxembourg European Capital of Culture 2007
 World Factbook: Information on Luxembourg
 Over 200 images of important sights in Luxembourg
 Chabad Lubavitch of Luxembourg
Worldwide Governance Indicators for Luxembourg, 1996-2006
 Luxembourg Earth science portal

 
 
Luxembourg